WFPC-LP (105.3 FM) is a radio station licensed by the Federal Communications Commission (FCC) to Franklin Pierce University. The station makes its home inside the Marlin Fitzwater Center for Communication in Rindge, New Hampshire.  This is a low power radio station run by students. WFPC-LP is a member of the Pierce Media Group.

PMG News Center
WFPC-LP is a station that features news every hour provided in part by the Associated Press and the PMG News Center.

Fitzwater Center's Presidency and the Press
WFPC-LP is involved with the Presidency and the Press workshop held annually during the summer on Franklin Pierce University's Rindge campus.

Pierce Media Group
The Pierce Media Group, run by students, is made up of the Pierce Arrow, FPC TV 25 the local Public-access television cable TV channel and Four Corners Marketing.

Marlin Fitzwater Center for Communication Tuesday Briefing Series 
Tuesday Briefings have invited government, civic and business leaders to Rindge New Hampshire to meet with students and answer questions. Guests have included Ann Compton from ABC News, Boston Globe New Hampshire Political correspondent James Pindell, Journalist and Author Linda Killian, former senior advisor to the Iraqi Ministry of Education and a member of the Franklin Pierce College Board of Trustees Leslye A. Arsht, Franklin Pierce and the Fitzwater Center hosted election 2006 New Hampshire senate rivals Paul Hodes and Charlie Bass, political activist Doris "Granny D" Haddock.

The Tuesday Briefings start at 11am EST.

External links
Fitzwater Center website
 

FPC-LP
FPC-LP
FPC-LP
Radio stations established in 2003
Cheshire County, New Hampshire
Franklin Pierce University